Jeannette Augustus Marks (August 16, 1875 – March 15, 1964) was an American professor at Mount Holyoke College. She is the namesake of the Jeannette Marks Cultural Center (formerly known as the Lesbian, Bisexual, and Transgendered Community Center), which provides support and programming for LGBT students and allies.

Biography
Born on August 16, 1875 in Chattanooga, Tennessee, her parents were Jeannette Holmes (née Colwell) and William Dennis Marks, who was the president of the Philadelphia Edison Company, after working at University of Pennsylvania, where he taught engineering. As her parents were estranged, Marks grew up mainly in the company of her mother and younger sister, Mabel, alternating homes between the parental properties in Philadelphia and Westport, New York.

Marks attended boarding schools in Europe the United States. She then attended Dana Hall School and Wellesley College. In 1899 she met Mary Emma Woolley, a Wellesley professor, with whom she entered into a relationship that lasted 48 years. In 1900, she earned a Bachelor's degree and three years later she received her Masters'.

From 1901 to 1939, Marks was at Mount Holyoke College, where she was a professor of English Literature. She founded a lecture series to discuss modern literature at the college named the Play and Poetry Shop Talks, which featured established poets and authors. She also founded the Laboratory Theatre in 1928, where she was its director until 1941. 

She was involved with the New York State branch of the National Woman's Party as a member and from 1942 to 1947 as its chair. She contributed with money to socialist causes and advocated for Eugene V. Debs and Nicola Sacco and Bartolomeo Vanzetti.

She lived in Westport, New York with Woolley. After Marks retired in 1941, the women spent the summers at the home of the Marks family, Fleur De Lys, on Lake Champlain. They lived there full-time from 1944, after Woolley suffered a stroke. Woolley died in 1947. Marks died in Westport, New York on March 15, 1964, and is buried there at Hillside Cemetery.

Works

Marks is the author of:
 
   Illustrations by Edith Brown.
 
   Co-authored with Julia Moody.
  Co-authored with Adrian J. Iorio, illustrations by Anna Whelan Betts.
  Co-authored with Julia Moody
 
  Co-authored with Mary Emma Woolley.
 
  Co-authored with George H. Doran.
 
 
 
 
 
 
 
 
  A biography of the family of Elizabeth Barrett Browning.
 
  Other authors include Jeannette Augustus Marks, Arthur Hopkins, Oscar Monroe Wolff, Eugene Pillot, David Pinski, Hermann Sudermann, Beulah Bornstead, August Strindberg, Lady Gregory, Anton Pavlovich Chekhov, Percy MacKaye, Alfred Kreymborg, J. M. Barrie, Paul Hervieu, Bosworth Crocker, George Middleton, Althea Thurston, and Paul Green.

References

External links

 

Wellesley College alumni
1875 births
1964 deaths
American lesbian writers
People from Chattanooga, Tennessee
Mount Holyoke College faculty
People from Westport, New York
Dana Hall School alumni